Donald Robert Anielak (November 1, 1930 – November 19, 1995) was an American professional basketball player and a high school coach. He starred at Southwest Missouri State University before playing professionally for the New York Knicks in 1954.

College career
Anielak played collegiately for two seasons at Moberly Junior College before transferring to Southwest Missouri State University where he played from 1952 to 1954. He originally signed on to play with Bradley, but left the school shortly before the first game of the 1951 season. In January 1953, he set the schools then single-game scoring record with 39 points at Northeast Missouri. A month later he scored 38 points against Warrensburg. He was a MIAA All-Conference selection in 1953 after leading the conference in scoring with 21.9 points per game. He won the NAIA championship the same season and was a member of the NAIA All-Tournament team that year. His total of 888 points remained a school record for a player in a two-year career until 1974. 

In 1989, Southwest Missouri State inducted Anielak into their Athletics Hall of Fame.

Professional career
After college, Anielak was selected by the New York Knicks in the third round (26th overall) of the 1954 NBA draft and signed with the team in August 1954. He appeared in one regular season game for the Knicks, scoring three points, before being waived in November 1954.

Later life
After his playing career ended, Anielak became a high school coach, first at St. Peter's High in St. Charles. He later coached at Ramsey Illinois where he accumulated a 56–18 record in three seasons before moving to Williamsville where he posted a 134–55 record in nine seasons. In 1972, he was hired as the head coach Koshkonong High School in Missouri and in 1974 he moved to North Boone High School in Illinois.

References

External links

 Missouri State Athletic HOF profile

1930 births
1995 deaths
American men's basketball players
Basketball players from St. Louis
Forwards (basketball)
High school basketball coaches in Illinois
High school basketball coaches in Missouri
Missouri State Bears basketball players
Moberly Greyhounds men's basketball players
New York Knicks draft picks
New York Knicks players